Hans Bethge (1890-1918) was a German First World War fighter ace credited with 20 confirmed aerial victories. He scored his first three aerial victories as a member of Germany's first dedicated fighter squadron, Jagdstaffel 1. On 14 January 1917, he was posted to command of a forming squadron, Jagdstaffel 30. He would score 17 more victories while in their lead. His 20th victory, a week before his death on 17 March 1918, qualified him for Germany's highest military honor, the Pour le Merite, or Blue Max, but his death in action scotched the award.

The victory list

Hans Bethge's victories are reported in chronological order, which is not necessarily the order or dates the victories were confirmed by headquarters.
Abbreviations were expanded by the editor creating this list.

Citations

Sources  

 

Aerial victories of Bethge, Hans
Bethge, Hans